Chit San Eain 2028 is a 2015 Burmese comedy-drama film, directed by Hein Soe starring Lu Min, Htun Eaindra Bo, Pyay Ti Oo, Eaindra Kyaw Zin, Nay Toe, Moe Hay Ko, Min Maw Kun, Wutt Hmone Shwe Yi, Nay Min, Chit Thu Wai, Htun Htun, Thinzar Wint Kyaw, Myint Myat and Soe Pyae Thazin. The film, produced by  Thinkayta Film Production premiered Myanmar on May 15, 2015.

Cast
Lu Min as Ko Oo
Htun Eaindra Bo as Moe Pwint
Pyay Ti Oo as Ko Phu
Eaindra Kyaw Zin as Sue
Nay Toe as Ko Latt
Moe Hay Ko as Shin Nyein
Min Maw Kun as Ko Toe
Wutt Hmone Shwe Yi as Wah Wah
Nay Min as Ko Hnaung
Chit Thu Wai as Thet Lyar
Htun Htun as Ko Htwe
Thinzar Wint Kyaw as Lint Lint
Myint Myat as Ko Nge
Soe Pyae Thazin as Thuzar 
Aung Lwin as Ba Gyi
Nwet Nwet San as Daw Kyay Yone

References

2015 films
2010s Burmese-language films
Burmese comedy-drama films
Films shot in Myanmar